Knockengorroch is a world music festival held annually among the Carsphairn hills in Kirkcudbrightshire Scotland. Originally there were two festivals held each year - the World Ceilidh, usually held around the end of May, and The Hairth, held in mid September. As of 2010, Knockengorroch ceased hosting two festivals each year and instead focused its attention on the Knockengorroch World Ceilidh festival. The festival started in 1998 and has licensing for around 3000 fans.

The early years

In mid-summer 1998 a 'rainbow gathering' was held on the Knockengorroch Farm in Galloway with the agreement of Simon and Liz Holmes. The festival is now an established event in the region. It has grown since its beginnings while still remaining an intimate and hospitable experience, welcoming people from all over Scotland, the UK and beyond for a relaxed, inspiring and riotous four days.

The festival has grown from an audience of 300 locals to 2700, including international visitors. The origin of the festival's name is unclear, but in Gaelic ‘knock’ (Cnoc) means a hill and ‘gorroch’ has a variety of meanings. The featured artists originate from Celtic, world and roots music genre and the festival has been held in various other locations as the Forest of Ae near Dumfries, and Talnotry near Newton Stewart.

Knockengorroch today

The festival now takes place in the Dumfries and Galloway hills, in a natural greenfield amphitheatre. The festival features outdoor and covered stages, a dance marquee, a recreated Iron Age Longhouse venue, a Ceilidh, a children’s marquee and procession, puppet shows, cabaret, fire shows, open mic, workshops, camping, real ale, food and shopping stalls. There is an emphasis on as much environmentally sound practice as possible, with a rigorous recycling policy, use of biodegradable products and alternative sources of power wherever possible, and both green and heritage workshops are available to participate in during the day.

The object of Knockengorroch artistic direction is to establish progressive linkage between the celebration of the natural amphitheatre of its  venues and the now far-flung Celtic diaspora, once rooted in such homely places. It is Knockengorroch’s remit not only to celebrate ethnic diversity and fusion, but to make the music home in its natural home.

On the still wider contemporary seas of world-music the aim is primarily to promote multi-cultural forms and musical genres, highlighting the connection between roots music and the land that gave birth to that music and its people.  Music from all continents is therefore booked alongside the best in Scottish, and European, talent to showcase Celtic and World music in both traditional and contemporary fields.

In 2015, Knockengorroch was one of 12 events to be recommended to be funded by Dumfries and Galloway Council's Major Events Strategic Fund.  Others on the list included the Eden Festival and the Lockerbie Jazz Festival.

Past line-ups
2015 line up
 Young Fathers
 Aziza Brahim
 B & the Roots Ragga Band
 Peatbog Faeries
 Shooglenifty
 Scratch Perverts
 Ferocious Dog
 Mungo's Hi Fi Soundsystem ft Solo Banton
 Awry
 Gnawa Blues All Stars
 Stanley Odd
 Age of Glass
 John Langan Band
 DJ Format
 Bella Hardy and Big Band
 The Girobabies
 Rob Heron & the Teapad Orchestra
 Samedia Shebeen
 The Amphetameanies
 Big Swing Soundsystem
 London Afrobeat Collective
 Blackbeard’s Tea Party
 Bunty Looping
 Jenova Collective
 Samson Sounds
 No Go Stop
 Colonel Mustard & The Dijon 5
 Fitty Gomash
 The Navigantes
 After Hours Quintet
 Ed Cox
 Frogpocket
 Jemima Thewes
 Ewan McLennan
 Kate in the Kettle
 Jeremy Mage & the Magi
 DJ Dolphin Boy
 The Badwills
 Skayaman
 Sticks and Stones
 The Razorbills
 The Chicken Brothers (TCB)
 Griogair
 Tam Tam 2000
 PyroCeltica
 Ross Ainslie
 Stivs
 Chapel Perilous Art System
 Mayawaska
 Breezak
 PJ Coyle
 Xymox
 DJ Brainstorm
 Easy Skankin Crew
 Andy Mac
 Ben-Jamin
 Papa Shanti
 Neil Templar
 Key Lo
 Kala Ushka
 DJ Nem
 Bit Monkey
 Tom Tom the Piper’s Son
 Mischief La-Bas
 Voice Box Theatre
 Teatro Magnetico
 BassTonik
 Swing and Shout
 Cosmic
 BBL vs Triple Drop
 Wobbley Social
 ETC
 The Too Much Fun Club presents Sketch the Rhyme

2009 (September) Knockengorroch Doonhaime Hairth Line-up
 Peatbog Faeries
 3 Daft Monkeys
 Tiger Style
 Tofu Love Frogs
 Latin Dub Sound System
 Glasgow Soundhaus
 Mungo’s Hi Fi
 Bombskare
 Sambayabamba
 Warblefly
 Ed Cox
 DJ Hobbes [Trouble]
 Black Diamond Express
 Frogpocket
 Punch & The Apostles
 Missing Cat
 Haight Ashbury
 Banana Sessions
 Kuch Ke
 Ruby & the Emeralds
 Paddy & the Waggoneers
 Mandalyn May

2009 World Ceilidh Line-up
 The Orb
 Roni Size with MC Jakes
 Orkestra Del Sol
 Errol Lintons Blues Vibe
 Terrafolk
 Mungo's Hi-Fi
 Skerryvore
 Michael Marra

2007 Festival Line-up

 Transglobal Underground
 Natacha Atlas
 Kíla
 Shooglenifty
 Go Lem System
 Mr Scruff
 Zion Train
 Fantazia
 Tannahill Weavers
 The Mordekkers
 Voces del Sur
 Mambo Jambo
 Kampec Dolores
 Albaroot
 Talking Drum
 The Belle Star Band
 Swing Guitars
 Jacob's Pillow
 Bombskare
 Cello Man
 Sun Honey
 Big Hand

2006 festival Line-up

 Bellowhead
 Eliza Carthy & the Ratcatchers
 Huun Huur Tu
 Old Blind Dogs
 Kangaroo Moon
 3 Daft Monkeys
 The Baghdaddies
 Big Hand
 Paddyrastas
 Pendulums
 Jacob's Pillow

2005 festival Line-up

 3 Daft Monkeys
 Babylon Arab Band
 Bebe Ouali
 Desmond Dekker & the Aces
 Elephant Talk 2
 Errol Linton's Blues Vibe
 John McSherry
 Le Cod Afrique
 Matt Seattle with the Eildon Strings
 Michael McGoldrick Band
 Mystery Juice
 Planet Woman
 Sheelanagig
 Tarantism
 The Assassenachs
 The Ruffness
 Virginia MacNaughton
 Wuyan Mei & Co

Primary Ticket Outlets

Skiddle

References

External links
 Knockengorroch official site
 Knockengorroch Past Line-ups

Recurring events established in 1998
Music festivals in Scotland